was a Japanese football player. He played for Japan national team.

Club career
Muraoka was born in Bunkyo, Tokyo on September 19, 1931. After graduating from Tokyo University of Education, he played for Kyodai Club which consisted of his alma mater Tokyo University of Education players and graduates. He retired in 1954.

National team career
In March 1954, when Muraoka was a Tokyo University of Education student, he was selected in the Japan national team for 1954 World Cup qualification. At this qualification, on March 7, he debuted against South Korea. He also played at 1954 Asian Games. He retired from playing career after this tournament. He played 2 games for Japan in 1954.

After retirement
After retirement, Muraoka became a journalist for Kyodo News and worked until 1991.

On March 13, 2017, Muraoka died of heart failure in Kodaira at the age of 85.

National team statistics

References

External links
 
 Japan National Football Team Database

1931 births
2017 deaths
University of Tsukuba alumni
Association football people from Tokyo Metropolis
People from Kodaira, Tokyo
Japanese footballers
Japan international footballers
Footballers at the 1954 Asian Games
Association football goalkeepers
Asian Games competitors for Japan